Hermann Salzner (15 July 1928 – 30 October 2010) was an Austrian sprint canoeist who competed from the mid-1950s to the early 1960s. He won a bronze medal in the K-1 4 x 500 m event at the 1954 ICF Canoe Sprint World Championships in Mâcon. Salzner also competed in two Summer Olympics, earning his best finish of 11th in the K-2 10000 m event at Melbourne in 1956.

References

Mention of Hermann Salzner's death 

1928 births
2010 deaths
Austrian male canoeists
Canoeists at the 1956 Summer Olympics
Canoeists at the 1960 Summer Olympics
Olympic canoeists of Austria
ICF Canoe Sprint World Championships medalists in kayak